Waterhen Lake may refer to:

Lakes
 Waterhen Lake (Manitoba)
 Waterhen Lake (Saskatchewan)

Places
 South Waterhen Lake, Saskatchewan
 Waterhen Indian Reserve No. 45 in Manitoba
 Waterhen Indian Reserve No. 130 in Saskatchewan
 Waterhen Lake First Nation in Saskatchewan